Rexton is a community in Kent County, New Brunswick, Canada. It was a village in its own right until the end of 2022.

On 1 January 2023, Rexton annexed parts of five local service districts to form the new village of Five Rivers. The community's name remains in official use.

History

Situated on the Richibucto River, the village was originally inhabited by Mi'kmaq First Nations, many of whose descendants still reside in the nearby Elsipogtog First Nation, formerly referred to as the Big Cove Band. Acadian settlers colonized the general area in the 18th century, in places such as Bouctouche, Miramichi and Richibucto Village.

The first English-speaking settler was Thomas Powel who arrived in 1790. There was considerable colonization by English shipbuilders, Scottish merchants and Irish immigrants followed, including many Irish Protestants who arrived to work in the Jardine Shipbuilding Yards around the year 1819. They eventually cleared enough land to receive land grants following the 1820s survey by a Mr. Layton conducted around the Molus River area of nearby Weldford Parish, New Brunswick and the size of Elsipogtog First Nation was reduced to the current boundaries.

Two ships brought the majority of the settlers here from Scotland, one being the Dickies, captained by Simon Graham, and the other was the Isabella, sailed by Captain Thomas Carruthers.

Fishing, lumbering and shipbuilding flourished throughout the 19th century. The first bridge over the Richibucto River was completed there in 1850, improving commerce and communications in the region.

The settlement was known from about 1825 as Kingston, but in 1901, the name was changed to Rexton. This was probably to avoid confusion with other Kingstons, particularly Kingston, Kings County, New Brunswick, which still carries the name.

Notable people

Rexton (Kingston at the time) was the birthplace of Bonar Law, Prime Minister of the United Kingdom in 1922–1923. Until the election of Boris Johnson in 2019, who was born in New York City, Law was the only British Prime Minister to be born outside the British Isles. His name is honoured at a recently upgraded community attraction, Bonar Law Common, and also at Bonar Law Memorial High School in Rexton. His father Rev. James Law was the Minister for St. Andrew's Church in Rexton for many years. William John Bowser, Premier of British Columbia (1915–1916), was born in Rexton. Former Premier of New Brunswick, Shawn Graham, was raised in Rexton.

Demographics

Population trend 

Religious make-up (2001)

Income (2006)

Mother tongue language (2011)

See also
 List of communities in New Brunswick
 Royal eponyms in Canada

References

Further reading
 Barry Kinread Glencross, Rexton: The First 175 Years (privately published, 2001)

External links

 Village of Rexton

Communities in Kent County, New Brunswick
Former villages in New Brunswick